Christian Wahnschaffe is a 1920 German silent drama film directed by Urban Gad and starring Conrad Veidt, Lillebil Ibsen, and Fritz Kortner. It was released in two parts World Ablaze (Weltbrand) in November 1920 and The Escape from the Golden Prison (Die Flucht aus dem goldenen Kerker) in March 1921. It is an adaptation of the novel of the same title by Jakob Wassermann. The film is extant, and was restored in 2018 by the Friedrich-Wilhelm-Murnau-Stiftung.

The film's sets were designed by the art director Robert A. Dietrich.

Cast

Part 1: World Ablaze

Part 2: The Escape from the Golden Prison

References

Bibliography

External links

1920 films
1921 films
Films of the Weimar Republic
Films directed by Urban Gad
German silent feature films
1920 drama films
German drama films
Terra Film films
German black-and-white films
1921 drama films
Silent drama films
1920s German films